John Patrick Lynch (6 February 1875 – 2 June 1944) was an Australian politician.

He was born near Parkes to miner William Sullivan Lynch and Mary Seymour. He attended local public schools and became a schoolteacher, working at Parkes from 1895 to 1897 and at various country schools thereafter. In 1907 he was elected to the New South Wales Legislative Assembly as the Labor member for Ashburnham. He served until his defeat in 1913. Subsequently he became a commercial agent and hotel manager. On 3 June 1922 he married Florence Staub. Lynch died at St Leonards in 1944.

References

1875 births
1944 deaths
Members of the New South Wales Legislative Assembly
Australian Labor Party members of the Parliament of New South Wales